Fairmount Cemetery may refer to several cemeteries in the United States:

Fairmount Cemetery (Denver, Colorado)
Fairmount Cemetery (Presque Isle, Maine)
Fairmount Cemetery (Newark, New Jersey)